WQBS may refer to:

 WQBS (AM), a radio station (870 AM) licensed to serve San Juan, Puerto Rico
 WQBS-FM, a radio station (107.7 FM) licensed to serve Carolina, Puerto Rico